is a city in Kumamoto Prefecture, Japan. The city was founded on April 1, 1942.

As of March 31, 2017, the city has an estimated population of 53,675, with 24,153 households and a population density of 940 persons per km². The total area is 57.15 km².

History 
Arao was once a large coal mining town, but it has since lost a great deal of its population, due to the closing of the mine 11 years ago. Some schools that once housed 1,500 children have now been looking at declining enrollments down 1,000 students or more. Arao's political concentration is on tourism, to try to lure people back to this once heavily populated land. Recent hopes to pull in tourists are in its two big amusement parks, Mitsui Greenland and Ultraman Land.

Economy 
One notable aspect of this city includes Shōdai ware, an art form almost completely exclusive to Arao, involving slow kilning and under glazing.

Also, the Arao nashi pear is a fruit product grown widely in this town. The pear is round, brown and about the size of a bowling ball.

References

External links 

  
 

Cities in Kumamoto Prefecture